The Nigeria Under-19 cricket team represents Nigeria in Under-19 cricket at the international level.

It took part in the 2020 Under-19 Cricket World Cup qualification ICC Africa Division One tournament, held in Namibia. Nigeria defeated pre-tournament favourites Namibia by 52 runs, Uganda by 30 runs and Kenya by 58 runs. Nigeria won the tournament and qualified for the 2020 Under-19 Cricket World Cup in South Africa for the first time. They finished in 15th place in the tournament, out of 16 teams, beating Japan in the final placement match.

Squad
Nigeria's squad was announced on 7 December 2019.

 Sylvester Okpe (c)
 Mohameed Taiwo (vc)
 Rasheed Abolarin
 Peter Aho
 Miracle Akhigbe
 Shehu Audu
 Oche Boniface
 Isaac Danladi
 Miracle Ikaige
 Akhere Isesele
 Abdulrahman Jimoh
 Samuel Mba
 Olayinka Olaleye
 Sulaimon Runsewe
 Ifeanyichukwu Uboh

References

Under-19 cricket teams
Cricket, under-19
Nigeria in international cricket